The New Brunswick Genealogical Society (NBGS) is a non-profit organization founded in 1978 and dedicated to historical genealogical research in New Brunswick, Canada. It publishes the Generations genealogical journal and the New Brunswick Vital Statistics from Newspapers.

In 2018, NBGS launched a project aimed to digitizing over 600 Anglican registers dating back to the 1790s.

References

External links
Official website

Genealogical societies
History of New Brunswick